Monique Owens (born February 21, 1984) is an American politician who is the first African-American mayor of Eastpointe, Michigan. She previously served on the Eastpointe City Council from 2017 to 2019. In 2022, Owens was named as a defendant in a federal lawsuit alleging that she violated the civil rights of four constituents by interrupting or censoring their remarks during public comment time at council meetings. In 2023, Owens was charged with false pretenses in 41B District Court, where she was accused of fraudulently applying for a COVID relief grant for one of her businesses.

Biography

Early career
Owens started her career as a clerical employee with the Detroit Police Department and later served as a Wayne County Sheriff's deputy for 11 years. The Wayne County Sheriff's Office suspended Owens in 2010.

Political career
Owens moved from Clinton Township to Eastpointe in 2010.

City Council
In 2017, a federal judge ruled that the city's methodology of electing of council members at-large rather than by district diluted the vote of the Black population (Eastpointe was 30% Black at the time) and was a violation of the Voting Rights Act. In 2017, Owens was elected to the Eastpointe City Council, the first African-American to serve as councilperson in the city.

LGBT issues
Owens was the only council member to vote "no" on the city's Pride Month resolution in 2019, saying that Eastpointe has "always accepted everybody". After becoming mayor, she voted against similar resolutions in both 2020 and 2021.

As mayor, Owens attended a Feb. 2020 speech by Louis Farrakhan which included anti-LGBT remarks.

Mayor
In 2019, incumbent mayor Suzanne Pixley did not file to run for re-election. On November 5, 2019, Owens was narrowly elected mayor with 32.5 percent of the vote in a five-way contest. She received 19 more votes than runner-up Mike Klinefelt.

Property tax exemptions
In July 2021, Owens applied for a poverty exemption from property taxes on her home in Eastpointe. The Eastpointe Board of Review later granted the mayor a 100 percent exemption from property taxes in 2021.

In 2022, Owens applied for a tax exemption again, but the Eastpointe Board of Review denied the exemption for 2022 on the grounds that her income exceeded the guidelines for a poverty exemption. Owens appealed the board's decision to the Michigan Tax Tribunal, which in February 2023 issued a judgment upholding the city's denial of the exemption. Paperwork submitted by Owens to the tribunal claimed that her annual income was less than $12,000. Judge Patricia Halm, however, noted that the testimony and evidence considered by the tribunal showed income of $43,695. Tax records reviewed by the Macomb Daily shortly after the decision showed that Owens owed $3,378 for summer and winter 2022 property taxes.

Museum dispute
In October 2021, Eastpointe Community Schools board member Mary Hall-Rayford criticized Owens for her behavior at the Michigan Military Technical & Historical Society Museum. The Macomb Daily reported that Owens brought someone to tour the museum during hours when it was closed to the public and that she entered areas that were restricted to museum employees only. Staff also complained that Owens violated the museum's policy prohibiting beverages near the exhibits and refused to comply when reminded of the rule. MMTHS board member Wendy Richardson said that she filmed Owens' visit using a cell phone due to legal concerns. Owens objected to the recording and alleged that museum staff had violated her rights by filming her.

Candidate for Harper Woods city manager position
In 2021, Owens applied for the full-time city manager position in Harper Woods, Michigan. In September, the city extended Owens a conditional job offer, which she accepted on September 30. Owens expressed her intent to remain mayor of Eastpointe while working as city manager of Harper Woods. The following day, the mayor of Harper Woods announced that Owens did not meet the conditions of the contract. As a result, Owens did not receive the job.

2021 city election
In Eastpointe's 2021 general election, Owens endorsed Shenita Lloyd and Michael Jones for city council. Both candidates were defeated by Cardi DeMonaco, an incumbent, and Rob Baker, who had previously served a partial term on the council.

That same day, voters also approved a city charter amendment requiring the city to hold a mayoral primary if more than two candidates run for mayor in the same election.

Censure
The Eastpointe City Council voted 3-1 to censure Owens at its April 5, 2022, meeting.

2022 city council walkout and federal lawsuit
At the council's September 6, 2022, meeting, Owens repeatedly interrupted and talked over residents during the public comment section of the meeting, objecting that speakers may not discuss a police matter involving Owens and another council member, Harvey Curley. The city's attorney advised the council that they may not restrict a speaker's subject matter, except for racial accusations and similar remarks. When Owens continued to interrupt subsequent speakers and raise her voice, all four council members walked out in protest, leaving Owens alone at the table and effectively ending the meeting.

On November 9, 2022, the  Foundation for Individual Rights and Expression (FIRE) filed suit in the U.S. District Court in Detroit, naming Owens and the City of Eastpointe as defendants. The lawsuit alleges that Owens violated the First and Fourteenth Amendment rights of four residents who attempted to speak during public comment periods at meetings by shouting them down, berating them, and otherwise preventing them from speaking. In addition to the three plaintiffs who attempted to speak during the public comment period of the September 6 meeting, a fourth plaintiff alleged similar treatment during a March 2022 meeting. The lawsuit further alleged that Owens frequently uses her authority “to suppress dissent and criticism by interrupting and shouting down members of the public who criticize her or raise subjects she finds personally embarrassing”. The lawsuit's stated purpose is to “stop Mayor Owens’s abuse of authority”.

On December 8, 2022, a federal judge issued a preliminary injunction, which the City agreed to, prohibiting Owens from shouting down speakers or restricting the subject matter of their remarks. The order is to remain in effect until the case is resolved or the court orders otherwise.

Missing financial disclosures
On December 13, 2022, the Eastpointe Board of Ethics voted 3-0 (with one abstention) to verify an ethics complaint against Owens which alleged that she had failed to file annual financial disclosures required under the city's ethics ordinance. At the time of the complaint, Owens had not filed a disclosure form since 2017. 

On January 30, 2023, the Ethics Board directed the city manager to issue a formal letter to Owens requesting that she submit her annual disclosure statements for 2021 and 2022 within 30 days. The board was unable to take action for missing disclosures prior to 2021 due to the ordinance's statute of limitations.

Criminal charge
On March 9, 2023, Owens was arraigned on a felony charge of false pretenses in 41B District Court. The Macomb County Prosecutor's Office alleged that she fraudulently applied for a COVID relief grant and received $10,000 from the program. Owens is accused of fraudulently stating that her business was 51 percent or more owned by veterans and had 100 or more employees. The warrant authorization request stated that Owens “has never served at any capacity in any of the armed forces, and according to state unemployment records has zero employees other than herself".

2022 Michigan Senate campaign
Owens filed on April 15 to run for the Republican nomination for state senate in the 11th district. Four days later, she withdrew from the Republican primary and filed to run in the Democratic primary in the same district.

On June 18, Owens attended the opening ceremonies of Cruisin' Gratiot, an annual car cruise hosted by a nonprofit in Eastpointe. As the ceremonies ended, Owens approached the microphone and spoke to the crowd against the organization's wishes. Harvey Curley, an 80 year-old longtime Cruisin' Gratiot board member who is also a city councilman, then confronted Owens. She later reported the incident to police, alleging that Curley had assaulted her. She also filed for a personal protective order.

The Macomb County Sheriff’s Office dismissed the complaint by Owens against Curley, and on September 23, 2022, Macomb County Circuit Court Judge Rachel Rancilio issued a denial of Owens’s request for a personal protection order.

The Detroit News endorsed Owens in the primary. The Detroit Free Press endorsed her opponent in the primary, citing Owens' "oddly malleable" values and expressing concern that she may switch her party affiliation again.

Owens lost the Democratic primary election to Veronica Klinefelt by a nearly two-to-one margin.

Personal life
Monique Owens lives in Eastpointe and has two children.

Owens is a Christian. She said in a 2021 city council meeting that she does not celebrate Christmas.

In 2022, Monique Owens authored a children's book titled Mom, What's a Mayor?

References

21st-century American politicians
African-American mayors in Michigan
Mayors of places in Michigan
1984 births
Living people
21st-century African-American politicians
20th-century African-American people
Women mayors of places in Michigan
20th-century African-American women
21st-century African-American women
People from Wayne County, Michigan
Freedom of speech in the United States
2022 controversies in the United States
Political controversies in the United States
American police officers
American politicians who switched parties
Michigan Democrats
Politicians from Detroit
Christians from Michigan
Pentecostals from Michigan
People from Detroit
African-American women mayors
21st-century American women politicians
Political scandals in the United States
2023 controversies in the United States